Franz Collection is a Taiwanese porcelain brand named after the founder's German name "Franz". The products of this company include porcelain tableware, home decor, art collectible, and jewelry. Founded in 2001 and headquartered in Taipei, Franz Collection Inc. designs, creates and markets a variety of functional and home decor accessories.

Its design and research center is based in Taipei, Taiwan, with production in Mainland China. In addition to sales, marketing and distribution facilities in the United States, Franz has representative offices in Europe and different parts of China, and works with distributors in South East Asia.

The company owns and operates approximately 100 retail stores in Asia. Its artworks have been distributed by retailers in 66 countries, including department stores and shopping centers such Bloomingdale's in the U.S., Mitsukoshi in Taiwan, Plaza Indonesia in Jakarta, Pavilion in Kuala Lumpur, Takashimaya in Singapore, Rustan’s in the Philippines, as well as Abu Dhabi Mall and the Mall of the Emirates in the United Arab Emirates. It has also done exhibitions at Harrods in London and Bergdorf Goodman in New York.

References

Porcelain
Taiwanese brands